Dyaberi is a small village in Bijapur Taluk of Bijapur District, Karnataka, India. It is situated at a distance of 16 km from the district headquarters in the city of Bijapur. It had a population of 2,772 inhabitants according to the 2001 census. The major community in this village is Marathas. The village operates on an agrarian economy.

Attractions

Vagdevi Temple
Temple of Goddess Vagdevi  is a  main attraction  for devotees. The temple has holy shrines of goddess sisters Vagubai and Neenabai. Goddess Neenabai resides in Doklewadi which comes in Maharastra State.

Dyaberi Tank
Minor irrigation tank providing water through canal to the village agriculture.

Ekthar Sahib Darga
A holy Shrine of the Ekthar Sahib

Transportation
You can reach Dyaberi through NWKTRC buses. Alternately you can reach through private cabs etc.,

Villages in Bijapur district, Karnataka